B. japonica may refer to:
 Balanophora japonica, a plant species
 Barnardia japonica, a bulbous flowering plant species
 Blera japonica, a hoverfly species
 Bombycilla japonica, the Japanese Waxwing, a fairly small passerine bird species found in north-east Asia
 Buddleja japonica, a plant species found in Honshu and Shikoku, Japan
 Buergeria japonica, the Ryukyu Kajika Frog or Ryukyu Kajikagaeru, a frog species found in Japan and Taiwan

See also 
 Japonica (disambiguation)